The 2011 Polish Speedway season was the 2011 season of motorcycle speedway in Poland.

Individual

Polish Individual Speedway Championship
The 2011 Individual Speedway Polish Championship final was held on 3 September at Leszno. Jarosław Hampel won the Polish Championship for the first time.

Golden Helmet
The 2011 Golden Golden Helmet organised by the Polish Motor Union (PZM) was the 2011 event for the league's leading riders. The final was held at Toruń on the 24 April. Adrian Miedziński won the Golden Helmet.

Junior Championship
 winner - Piotr Pawlicki Jr.

Silver Helmet
 winner - Maciej Janowski

Bronze Helmet
 winner - Patryk Dudek

Pairs

Polish Pairs Speedway Championship
The 2011 Polish Pairs Speedway Championship was the 2011 edition of the Polish Pairs Speedway Championship. The final was held on 22 June at Zielona Góra.

Team

Team Speedway Polish Championship
The 2011 Team Speedway Polish Championship was the 2011 edition of the Team Polish Championship. ZKŻ Zielona Góra won the gold medal.

Ekstraliga

Play offs

1.Liga

2.Liga

References

Poland Individual
Poland Team
Speedway
2011 in Polish speedway